Carychium pessimum is a species of minute air-breathing land snail, a terrestrial pulmonate gastropod mollusk in the family Ellobiidae.

Distribution
South Korea

References

External links 

Ellobiidae
Gastropods described in 1902